Rok Petrovič  (5 February 1966 – 16 September 1993) was a Yugoslav and Slovenian alpine skier.

Petrovič was born in Ljubljana, Yugoslavia, the son of Zdenka Steiner and Krešimir Petrović, a well known sports psychologist of Croatian origin. His first success in alpine ski racing was the 1983 Junior World Championship slalom title in Sestriere, Italy.

After this he rapidly advanced up the world slalom rankings. In the 1985–86 Alpine Skiing World Cup season, he was practically unbeatable in slalom, his competition left to wait for rare mistakes in his highly aggressive and innovative skiing style. That season he won 5 races, is second in St. Anton, Austria and third in Geilo, Norway, easily winning the World Cup slalom title and becoming the first Yugoslav with a crystal globe.

After his championship-winning season, Petrovič was unable to recapture his winning form, the only hint of his championship season being a second place behind his teammate Bojan Križaj at the unforgettable race in Kranjska Gora next season.  He finished eighth in the 1988 Winter Olympic Games giant slalom.

Due to his lack of winning results, he quit skiing in 1988 and began studies at the College of Sports in Ljubljana. He graduated in 1991 and continued with post-graduate study. He was to defend his M.Sc. thesis in the autumn of 1993, but shortly before defending his thesis he took a short break at the Croatian island Korčula and drowned in a diving accident.

Altogether he won 5 World Cup races, all in slalom and all in his champion season in 1985-86:

World Cup results

Season titles

Season standings

Race podiums

External links
 

1966 births
1993 deaths
Skiers from Ljubljana
Yugoslav male alpine skiers
Slovenian male alpine skiers
Olympic alpine skiers of Yugoslavia
Alpine skiers at the 1988 Winter Olympics
Underwater diving deaths
Accidental deaths in Croatia
FIS Alpine Ski World Cup champions
Slovenian people of Croatian descent